Luis Alfonso Alarcón Mansilla (born 23 October 1929), popularly known as Lucho Alarcón, is a Chilean actor, theater director, and activist with a distinguished film, television, and stage career.

He later began his career as a cinematic actor, appearing in emblematic films such as Three Sad Tigers, Jackal of Nahueltoro, The Expropriation, Julio comienza en julio, Nadie dijo nada, Little White Dove, Caluga o menta, and The Shipwrecked.

In 1993, he was instrumental in the creation of ChileActores, of which he would become the founding President. In 1999, he co-starred in the telenovela , starring actress Claudia di Girolamo, which became a praised and awarded soap opera. From 1995 to 2008 he was part of the stable cast of Sabatini. Through the producer's success, Alarcón continued to work with important figures in cinema, theater, and television.

He is the creator of the Patagonia Film Festival, a gala developed in the Cueva del Milodón. Currently, he is officially recognized as the actor with the longest career in Chilean cinema, occasionally collaborating with Raúl Ruiz, Helvio Soto, Miguel Littín, Emilio Gómez Muriel, and Silvio Caiozzi.

Career
The grandson of actor and director Justo Alarcón, Luis loved the art of film from a very young age. In Puerto Natales, where he was born, he became friends with the daughter of the cinema administrator, and there he learned the trade. In addition, his father – who worked in a refrigerator – was an amateur documentary filmmaker.

There is no other performer in Chilean cinema who has appeared, like Alarcón, in such a large number of films. His origins as an actor, however, are in the theater, an activity that officially began (he had previously acted in school functions) in 1951, and since then he has acted in around 90 theatrical pieces. He relates that his vocation was defined after attending an exhibition of Death of a Salesman, by Arthur Miller. He studied Corporal Expression and Pantomime with Alejandro Jodorowsky, and with Enrique Gajardo and Pedro de la Barra at the Dramatic Arts Center of the Pedagogical Institute of the University of Chile, among others.

Pedro Chaskel, who worked as assistant director on the film, would some years later become the director of Experimental Cinema at the University of Chile.

Alarcón participated in 's first film, La Universidad en la Antarctica (1962), which he narrated. Later, along with much of his theater company, he starred in Raúl Ruiz's first feature film El tango del viudo (1967). Rather than ending, the shoot led directly into the making of Three Sad Tigers (1968), considered one of the most important films of Chilean cinema.

That same year he was summoned to join the experimental film team of the University of Chile, which produced his first feature film project called Jackal of Nahueltoro, based on real events in the San Carlos region, where an illiterate murders a whole family and later, after being educated in prison, is condemned to death. Alarcón would initially play a journalist, but he then became involved in the production of the film with Luis Cornejo himself. Jackal of Nahueltoro broke public attendance records, only surpassed by the television hit adapted to the big screen, Germán Becker's Ayúdeme usted compadre.

Later, Luis Alarcón participated in a large portion of Raúl Ruiz's films such as Nadie dijo nada (1970), The Penal Colony (1970), The Expropriation (1971), and Little White Dove (1973).

On television he has played emblematic characters on TVN's Dramatic Area series, such as Pedro Chamorro on La fiera, who at all costs wants to marry his eldest daughter, due to a promise made to his dying wife. He is also well known for his role as Roberto Betancourt on the television series La represa, a very evil and abusive landlord.

He is also known for his Indian character in advertising for the Firestone tire brand. For one such commercial, shot by director Silvio Caiozzi, Alarcón won a Golden Lion Award at the 1986 Cannes Film Festival.

In 2017, he received the Golden Spike Award from the Institute of Higher Communication Studies for his outstanding artistic career in Chilean cinema.

Filmography

Television

Awards and recognitions
 Golden Lion of the Cannes Film Festival (1986)
 Recognition of the film industry at the 7th Viña del Mar International Film Festival (1994)
  (APES) Award (1995) – Best Lead Actor for Estúpido Cupido
 APES Award (1999) – Best Lead Actor for La Fiera
 Altazor Award (2000) – Best Actor for La Fiera
 APES Award (2000) – Best Acting Career
 Relevant Contribution to National Cinema from the Ministry of Education of Chile (2001)
 Pablo Neruda Order of Artistic and Cultural Merit (2007)
 Honorific Medal of the Senate of the Republic of Chile (2008)
 Tribute for 50-year career by the Corporation of Actors of Chile (ChileActores)
 Pedro de la Barra Medal for his six decades of acting work, awarded by the University of Chile
 Honorary Acting Career Award of the Quilpué Film Festival (2010)
 Named Illustrious Son of Puerto Natales by the authorities of the city
 Pudú Prize for cinematic career at the Valdivia Film Festival
 Golden Spike Award from the Institute of Higher Communication Studies (2017)
 Lifetime Achievement Award at the Caleuche Awards (2018)

References

External links
 

1929 births
20th-century Chilean male actors
21st-century Chilean male actors
Chilean male film actors
Chilean male stage actors
Chilean male telenovela actors
Chilean theatre directors
Living people
People from Puerto Natales
University of Chile alumni